Salawat (salat; also referred to as divine blessings on Muhammad, durood shareef or durood-e-Ibrahim) is an Islamic complimentary Arabic phrase which contains Veneration for Muhammad. This phrase is usually expressed by the Muslims as part of their five times daily prayers (usually during the tashahhud) and also when Muhammad's name is mentioned.

Salawat is a plural form of salat and from the triliteral root of ṣ-l-w the letters "ṣād-lām-wāw" which means "prayer" or "salutation".

Arabic philologists hold the view that the meaning of the word salawat would vary according to who has used the word, and to whom it is used for.

Significance
In Islam, when a Muslim or Islamic angels (malā'ikah) recite salawat, it means they are sending it to the prophet and are showing Allah their respect for Muhammad, while when the same is sending upon prophet by Allah himself, it means he is blessed by Allah. "When Muhammad sends Salawat upon the believers, it indicates his prayer for their welfare, blessing and salvation."

Muhammad was also reported saying: "The meanest person is he who does not invoke Salawat upon me when my name is mentioned in his presence."

Ibn Asakri transmitted from al-Hasan bin Ali that Muhammad said: "Invoke more Salawat upon me, for your invocation is conducive to your sins being forgiven. And pray for me a high status and intercession, for surely my intercession will plead in your favour before Allah."

According to Ja'far al-Sadiq, Muhammad said: "All supplications to Allah will remain in a veil from the sky until a Salawat is sent to Mohammad PBUH and his Household." In another tradition, Ja'far al-Sadiq was quoted that: "Whoever sends Salawat on the Prophet PBH and his Household means 'I am standing on the promise that I gave when Allah asked me, 'Am I not your lord? And I answered yes you are.'"

Salawat contents

One Salawat recommended by Muhammad is:

ʾAllāhumma ṣalli ʿalā Muḥammadin wa ʿalā ʾāli Muḥammadin kamā ṣallayta ʿalā ʾIbrāhīma wa ʿalā ʾāli ʾIbrāhīma ʾinnaka Ḥamīdun Majīdun ʾAllāhumma bārik ʿalā Muḥammadin wa ʿalā ʾāli Muḥammadin kamā bārakta ʿalā ʾIbrāhīma wa ʿalā ʾāli ʾIbrāhīma ʾinnaka Ḥamīdun Majīdun

Muhammad was also reported to have said: "Do not invoke incomplete salawat upon me". His Sahabah asked him: "What is incomplete salawat?" He replied them: "When you say: 'O Allah, send blessing to Muhammad' and then stop on that. Rather say: ٱللَّٰهُمَّ صَلِّ عَلَىٰ مُحَمَّدٍ وَعَلَىٰ آلِ مُحَمَّدٍ 'O Allah! send Your blessing to Muhammad and the progeny of Muhammad."

Variants of Salawat
There are several variant phrases of Salawat that may be used. The most common phrases are:

Benefits Salawat
It is said that whoever sends 10 Salawat upon Muhammad and his household will be sent a thousand Salawat by God and his angels, and whoever sends 1,000 Salawat upon Muhammad and his household will not be affected by the fire of hell.

Sending Salawat upon Muhammad and his progeny is said to pave way for his intercession on the judgement day, serve as a compensation for sins, and to be the most weighty deed on the scale of deeds. Salawat upon Muhammad and his households is said to lead to the affection of God and his messenger, to purify deeds, and to serve as the light in the grave, As-Sirāt bridge and Paradise.

Salawat is said to be one of the best deeds on Friday, and is said to lighten and open the heart.

Reciting Salawat aloud is said to vanish hypocrisy, and continuous recitation of Salawat is said to fulfil one's worldly and heavenly wants (supplication).

Unicode

See also

References

External links
 Collection of Durood Shareef

Muhammad
Hadith
Islamic terminology
Sufism
Religious formulas